Convention Center station is a light rail station on the MAX Blue, Green and Red Lines in Portland, Oregon. It is the 8th stop eastbound on the current Eastside MAX, having not been built when the original line opened, in 1986.  It was built to serve the Oregon Convention Center, which did not exist when the MAX line opened, and was completed and opened in the same month as the Convention Center, September 1990.

The station is located on Northeast Holladay Street at its intersection with Northeast Martin Luther King Jr. Boulevard.  Although the station primarily serves the Oregon Convention Center, and the main entry to that building faces the light rail station, there are also a number of hotels immediately east and also north of the station.

From 2001 to 2012, this station was located within Fareless Square (renamed the Free Rail Zone in 2010), but the free-ride zone was discontinued in September 2012.

Portland Streetcar connection
Southbound streetcars on the Portland Streetcar's Loop Service (called the CL Line until 2015), or A Loop cars, to the Central Eastside district and the Oregon Museum of Science and Industry (OMSI), serve a stop located about 1,000 feet south of this station, on Martin Luther King Jr. Blvd., on the Convention Center's east side (stop ID 5912).  Northbound/eastbound streetcars on the same line, B Loop cars, to the Pearl District and the West End of downtown, serve a stop about 400–500 feet from this station, on NE Grand Avenue just south of Holladay Street (stop ID number 2175).

Bus line connections
This station is served by the following bus line:
6-Martin Luther King Jr Blvd.

References

External links

Station information (with westbound ID number) from TriMet
Station information (with eastbound ID number) from TriMet

MAX Light Rail stations
MAX Blue Line
MAX Red Line
MAX Green Line
Railway stations in the United States opened in 1990
1990 establishments in Oregon
Lloyd District, Portland, Oregon
Railway stations in Portland, Oregon
Northeast Portland, Oregon